The Lafayette Elementary School in Lafayette, Louisiana, now Lafayette Middle School, is a historic school building located at 1301 West University Avenue.

Built in 1926 and designed by William T. Nolan, the two-story Gothic Revival institutional building is a brick and concrete E-shaped structure with a long frontal main block and three rear wings.

The building was listed on the National Register of Historic Places on June 14, 1984.

See also
 National Register of Historic Places listings in Lafayette Parish, Louisiana

References

School buildings on the National Register of Historic Places in Louisiana
Greek Revival architecture in Louisiana
School buildings completed in 1926
Lafayette Parish, Louisiana
National Register of Historic Places in Lafayette Parish, Louisiana
1926 establishments in Louisiana